Creta Channel (now as TV Creta) is a television channel broadcast to the majority of Crete. Its programming is split between TV shopping and entertainment and cultural content.

External links
 

Crete
Greek-language television stations
Television channels in Greece